Seyed Jafar Kashfi is an Iranian calligrapher and cultural worker, who lives in Qom in Iran. He was resident in Sweden for many years where he worked as an imam, religious leader, and taught Islamic calligraphy. He was also instrumental in the publishing of translations of classical Persian poetry into Swedish. Jafar Kashfi is also an expert on the conservation of ancient and medieval monuments in Iran.

In 2014, Ahlulbayt TV made a short documentary on Islamic Calligraphy featuring Seyed. He discussed its various forms and styles, the tools used therewith and provided demonstrations of its practise.

References

External links 
Example of Seyed Jafar Kashfi's calligraphy

Iranian calligraphers
Swedish imams
Swedish translators
Swedish people of Iranian descent
People from Qom
Living people
Year of birth missing (living people)